Megaspora is a genus of lichens in the family Megasporaceae. The genus was described in 1984 with M. verrucosa as the type species.

References

Pertusariales genera
Lichen genera
Pertusariales
Taxa named by Georges Clauzade
Taxa described in 1984